This is a list of people (real or fictional) appearing on the cover of Rolling Stone magazine in the 2020s. This list is for the regular monthly issues of the magazine, including variant covers, and does not include special issues.

2020

2021

2022

2023

References

Lists of actors
Lists of entertainers
Lists of musicians
2020s